Jugović is a Serbo-Croatian family name the origin of which can be traced back into the 14th century. It is more common among ethnic Serbs than Croats and can be found throughout the successor states to the former Yugoslavia. Now this is commonly a Bosnian family name.  

Notable people with this name include:

 Dragana Jugović del Monaco (born 1963), Serbian mezzo-soprano opera singer
 Igor Jugović (born 1989), Croatian football midfielder
 Jovan Jugović (1886–1926), Serbian aviator and fighter
 Marjan Jugović (born 1983), Serbian footballer
 Sofronije Jugović-Marković (18th century), Habsburg Serb writer and activist in Russian service
 Vedran Jugović (born 1989), Croatian footballer
 Vesna Jugović (born 1957), Serbian television author, journalist and writer
 Vladimir Jugović (born 1969), Serbian former footballer

See also 
 Jugović brothers
 RK Jugović
 Jugovići (disambiguation)

References 

Croatian surnames
Serbian surnames